Yerliağalı (also, Agalu and Yerli Agaly) is a village and municipality in the Barda Rayon of Azerbaijan.  It has a population of 191.

References

Populated places in Barda District